Jerome Tochukwu Ogbuefi (born 26 August 1991) is a Nigerian footballer. He currently plays for the Finnish Kakkonen club Kajaanin Haka.

References

External links
 kups.fi
 veikkausliiga.com
 

1991 births
Living people
Nigerian footballers
Nigerian expatriate footballers
Thanh Hóa FC players
Kuopion Palloseura players
TP-47 players
Haukiputaan Pallo players
Kemi City F.C. players
AC Kajaani players
Kajaanin Haka players
Veikkausliiga players
Kakkonen players
Association football midfielders
Expatriate footballers in Finland
Expatriate footballers in Vietnam
Nigerian expatriate sportspeople in Finland
Nigerian expatriate sportspeople in Vietnam
JS Hercules players